Leave Myself Behind is the 2004 debut novel by American writer Bart Yates. The plot centers on a seventeen-year-old gay boy, Noah York, and the process through which he goes as he discovers his sexuality and grows without his father.  Critics have compared Leave Myself Behind to J.D. Salinger's Catcher in the Rye.  The book was given an Alex Award by the American Library Association.

References

External links
 http://www.bartyates.com - The author's website

2004 American novels
Novels by Bart Yates
2004 debut novels